Babylonia is a genus of sea snails, marine gastropod mollusks in the family Babyloniidae.

Species
According to the World Register of Marine Species (WoRMS), the following species with valid names are included within the genus Babylonia:

 Babylonia ambulacrum (G. B. Sowerby I, 1825)
 Babylonia areolata (Link, 1807)
 Babylonia borneensis (G. B. Sowerby II, 1864)
 Babylonia feicheni Shikama, 1973
 Babylonia formosae (G. B. Sowerby II, 1866)
 Babylonia japonica (Reeve, 1842)
 Babylonia kirana Habe, 1965
 † Babylonia leonis van Regteren Altena & Gittenberger, 1972
 Babylonia lutosa (Lamarck, 1816)
 Babylonia perforata (G. B. Sowerby II, 1870)
 Babylonia pieroangelai Cossignani, 2008
 Babylonia spirata (Linnaeus, 1758)
 Babylonia umbilifusca Gittenberger & Goud, 2003
 Babylonia valentiana (Swainson, 1822)
 Babylonia zeylanica (Bruguière, 1789)
The following species were brought into synonymy:
 Babylonia habei van Regteren Altena & Gittenberger, 1981
 Babylonia hongkongensis Lai & Guo, 2010
 Babylonia lani Gittenberger & Goud, 2003
 Babylonia magnifica Fraussen & Stratmann, 2005
 Babylonia pallida Kira, 1959
 Babylonia pallida Hirase, 1934
 Babylonia papillaris (Sowerby I, 1825)
 Babylonia pintado Kilburn, 1971
 Babylonia pulchrelineata Kilburn, 1973
 Babylonia rosadoi Bozzetti, 1998
 Babylonia tessellata (Swainson, 1823)

References

External links

 Altena C. O. van Regteren & Gittenberger E. (1981). "The genus Babylonia (Prosobranchia: Buccinidae)". Zoologische Verhandelingen 188: 1-57, + 11 pls. PDF.
 Gittenberger E. & Goud J. (2003). "The genus Babylonia revisited (Mollusca: Gastropoda: Buccinidae)". Zoologische Verhandelingen 345: 151-162. PDF